Gibraltar Rock Provincial Park Reserve is a park and trail in Gibraltar in the Musquodoboit Valley in the Halifax Regional Municipality of Nova Scotia.

References

The Gibraltar Loop
Gibraltar Rock Loop Trail Nova Trails

Parks in Halifax, Nova Scotia